The UK Rock & Metal Albums Chart is a record chart which ranks the best-selling rock and heavy metal albums in the United Kingdom. Compiled and published by the Official Charts Company, the data is based on each album's weekly physical sales, digital downloads and streams. In 2008, there were 24 albums that topped the 52 published charts. The first number-one album of the year was Led Zeppelin's compilation album Mothership, which topped the chart for the week ending 24 November 2007 and remained at number one for seven weeks, including the first week of 2008. The final number-one album of the year was Chinese Democracy, the sixth studio album by American hard rock band Guns N' Roses, which topped the chart for the week ending 6 December and remained at number one until 10 January 2009.

The most successful album on the UK Rock & Metal Albums Chart in 2008 was Nickelback's fifth studio album All the Right Reasons, which spent a total of twelve weeks at number one over four separate spells. All the Right Reasons was also the best-selling rock and metal album of the year in the UK, ranking 11th in the UK End of Year Albums Chart. AC/DC's Black Ice and Chinese Democracy by Guns N' Roses each spent four weeks at number one during the year, while three albums – Muse's HAARP, Kid Rock's Rock n Roll Jesus and Metallica's Death Magnetic – were all number one for three weeks during 2008. An additional five albums – Echoes, Silence, Patience & Grace, Good to Be Bad, Somewhere Back in Time, Indestructible and All Hope Is Gone each spent two weeks at number one during the year.

Chart history

See also
2008 in British music
List of UK Rock & Metal Singles Chart number ones of 2008

References

External links
Official UK Rock & Metal Albums Chart Top 40 at the Official Charts Company
The Official UK Top 40 Rock Albums at BBC Radio 1

2008 in British music
United Kingdom Rock and Metal Albums
2008